Rosario Del Pilar Fernández Figueroa (born 1955) is a Peruvian politician, who is a former Prime Minister of Peru and Minister of Justice.

Biography

Fernández was born in Lima, Peru. She is the daughter of Joffre Fernandez Veldivieso, a constitutional lawyer and former Deputy and Minister of Justice from 1985 to 1990.

She studied law at Pontifical Catholic University of Peru, ranking first in the 1977 graduating class. She continued advanced studies in Washington, D.C., gaining experience in civil procedure, arbitration, civil law, family law and international law.

In 2007, Fernández was named Minister of Justice, a position that she resigned from in 2009. The following year, she returned to the political scene to replace Victor Garcia Toma after the turbulence caused by the Legislative Decree No. 1097.

Fernandez was the vice chairman of the Lima Stock Exchange from 1988 to 1991 and Treasurer of the Board of the Lima Bar Association from 1993 to 1994. During this time, she was also appointed to various committee positions in the Peruvian government, including attorney ad hoc of the Supervisory Agency for Investment in Energy, alternate member of the committee to Protect Minority Shareholders of National Supervisory Commission for Companies and Securities (CONASEV).

She is married to lawyer Ernest Coz and is the mother of two daughters.

References

|-

|-

1955 births
Living people
Peruvian women lawyers
Peruvian Ministers of Justice
Prime Ministers of Peru
Women prime ministers
Female justice ministers
People from Lima
Pontifical Catholic University of Peru alumni
21st-century Peruvian women politicians
21st-century Peruvian politicians
20th-century Peruvian lawyers